Winston Knoll Collegiate (WKC) is a public high school located in the Walsh Acres neighbourhood of northwestern Regina, Saskatchewan, Canada. A part of Regina Public Schools, it opened in 1996, to alleviate the congestion at Thom Collegiate, and currently serves a community of just over 1100 students. The school operates based on a college system, which separates students based on their grade and allots them a specific group of teachers and classrooms. A strong emphasis on technology is also encouraged.

The front archway was deported from the former Central Collegiate Institute, the first high school in the city.

The school has a total of six designated areas called Colleges. The Colleges are split over two stories. There are Colleges A,B,C,D,E,F and B-west. Each College contains a number of classrooms. There are a total of five computer labs, located in A,B,C,D,and E. The school also has a number of laptop computers stored in the Library.

Winston Knoll Collegiate is wheelchair accessible and has an elevator, as well as a FIAP program.

The school also has a successful commercial kitchen which helps trains students into the food industry. The kitchen/cafeteria is called Winston's.

Current feeder elementary schools include Centennial School, George Lee School, Henry Janzen School, MacNeill School, Plainsview School, and W.H. Ford School.

Affiliated communities
Normanview West 
Prairie View 
Sherwood/McCarthy 
Twin Lakes 
Walsh Acres 
Westhill 
Lakewood
Lakeridge

Notable alumni
Rory Kohlert - professional football player

References

High schools in Regina, Saskatchewan
Educational institutions established in 1996
1996 establishments in Saskatchewan